Kalingapal is a twin/composite village consisting of two revenue villages known as Kalinga and Palachakada. It also includes a hamlet known as Bandhanali. This village is in Dhenkanal district, Odisha, India.

History 
This is an ancient village with a known history of 300 years and was part of Hindol State, which was one of the princely states of India during the period of the British Raj.

Demography 

The village falls under Kalinga Panchayat of Hindol block. The population is around 2500 (Including Kalinga and Palachakada) as per 2011 census.

The village is well connected with Roads and frequent bus services to Bhubaneswar, Cuttack, Dhenkanal, Anugul and other parts of the district and state. National Highway 655 (India) is just 2 km away from the village.

The village has a post office named Kalingapal.

Schools 

 Kalingapal High School
 KalingaPal UP School
 Sri Aurobindo Life Education Center

Temples 
Kalingapal has an ancient Kothaghara with the temple of Lord Bankabihari (Krishna). The village has also a Ram temple, a Kali temple and other small temples of village deities.

Festivals 
There are multiple festivals observed in the villages. However, there are grand celebrations of Dola jatra/Holi, Laxmi Puja, Meru Jatra, Janmastami and Ratha Yatra. The annual Astaprahari also being held in a grand manner every year. Other festivals like Khudurukuni, Jahni Osha, Raja, Makara Sankranti are also celebrated.

References 

Villages in Dhenkanal district